Lucas Seimandi (born 26 July 1993) is an Argentine professional footballer who plays as a midfielder for Sportivo Belgrano.

Career
Seimandi signed for Biblioteca Bell in January 2016, prior to joining Centro Deportivo Roca. Seimandi joined Torneo Federal B club Sarmiento in 2017, scoring three goals in twenty-two appearances for the club. Sportivo Las Parejas completed the signing of Seimandi in 2018. Months later, after being selected in eight Torneo Federal A matches, Seimandi was signed by Agropecuario of Primera B Nacional. He made his professional debut on 5 November during a goalless draw with Sarmiento (J).

Career statistics
.

References

External links

1993 births
Living people
People from General Roca
Argentine footballers
Association football midfielders
Torneo Federal A players
Primera Nacional players
Sportivo Las Parejas footballers
Club Agropecuario Argentino players
Club Atlético Mitre footballers
Club Olimpo footballers
Sportivo Desamparados footballers
Sportivo Belgrano footballers